General Barnard may refer to:

Andrew Barnard (1773–1855), British Army general
Henry William Barnard (1799–1857), British Army lieutenant general
John G. Barnard (1815–1882), U.S. Army brigadier general and brevet major general